The Men's omnium was held on 22–23 October 2011. 18 riders participated over six competitions.

Medalists

Results

Flying lap
The flying lap was held at 14:40.

Points race
The race was held at 16:44.

Elimination race
The race was held at 20:24.

Individual Pursuit
The race was held at 11:50.

Scratch race
The race was held at 15:46.

1km time trial
The race was held at 18:26.

Final Classification
After six events.

References

2011 European Track Championships
European Track Championships – Men's omnium